Lapo de Carlo (Milan, 4 December 1968) is an Italian sports journalist and presenter. He is the radio director of Radio Nerazzurra. He also worked for Radio CNR, Radio Italia Network, Radio Donna and Radio Via Montenapoleone.

Since 2008, he has been a consultant in public speaking at the University of Milan Bicocca at the Faculty of Psychology.

He also works in the television program, Qui studio a voi stadio, since 2013.

He is the son of the writer Adriano de Carlo.

References

External links 
 

1968 births
Journalists from Milan
Italian male journalists
Living people
Mass media people from Milan
Academic staff of the University of Milano-Bicocca